Pjetër or Për is an Albanian male given name, which is a cognate of Peter, derived ultimately from the Greek word petros, meaning "stone" or "rock". The name may refer to:

Pjetër Arbnori (1935–2006), Albanian politician
Pjetër Bogdani (1630–1689), Albanian writer
Pjetër Budi (1566–1622), Albanian writer
Pjetër Dungu (1908–1989), Albanian musician
Pjetër Gjoka (1912–1982), Albanian actor
Pjeter Losha (died 1374), Albanian nobleman
Pjetër Malota (born 1958), Albanian actor
Pjetër Marubi (1834–1903), Italian photographer
Pjetër Mazreku (1584–1650), Albanian bishop
Pjetër Poga (1850–1944), Albanian politician
Peter Spani (League of Lezhë) (died 1457), Albanian nobleman
Pjetër Zakaria (died 1414), Albanian bishop
Pjetër Zarishi (1806–1866), Albanian writer

References

Albanian masculine given names